General elections were held in Cuba on 3 November 1958. The three major presidential candidates were Carlos Márquez Sterling of the Partido del Pueblo Libre, Ramón Grau of the Partido Auténtico and Andrés Rivero Agüero of the Coalición Progresista Nacional. There was also a minor party candidate on the ballot, Alberto Salas Amaro for the Union Cubana party. Voter turnout was estimated at about 50% of eligible voters. Although Andrés Rivero Agüero won the presidential election with 70% of the vote, he was unable to take office due to the Cuban Revolution. This was the last competitive election in Cuba, the 1940 Constitution of Cuba, the Congress and the Senate of the Cuban Republic, were quickly dismantled shortly thereafter.

Background
The rebels had publicly called for an election boycott, issuing its Total War Manifesto on 12 March 1958, threatening to kill anyone that voted.

Results

President

Chamber of Representatives
The 166 members of the Chamber of Representatives were elected; 85 for a four-year term 81 for a two-year term.

Aftermath
Rivero Agüero was due to be sworn-in on 24 February 1959. In a conversation between him and the American ambassador Earl E. T. Smith on 15 November 1958, he called Castro a "sick man" and stated it would be impossible to reach a settlement with him. Rivero Agüero also said that he planned to restore constitutional government and would convene a Constitutional Assembly after taking office.

See also
Cuba–United States relations
History of Cuba
Timeline of Cuban history
1940 Constitution of Cuba
Earl E. T. Smith

References

External links
Cuba 1958 Articles
Cuba, a country study, Federal Research Division Library of Congress
Foreign Relations of the United States, 1958–1960, Cuba, Volume VI/Despatch From the Embassy in Cuba to the Department of State
Elections and Events 1952-1959_San Diego
Diario La Marina_1, 2 November 1958
Diario La Marina_2, 2 November 1958
1958: Cuba's Last Election Day
The 1940 Constitution of Cuba—
The 1940 Constitution of Cuba—

Cuba
Presidential elections in Cuba
General election 
Annulled elections
Cuban general election 
Election and referendum articles with incomplete results